Diego Luis González Alcaraz (born 7 January 2003) is a Paraguayan professional footballer who plays as a forward for  club Lazio, on loan from Celaya.

Club career
González took an interest in football from the age of five, and joined Escuela de Fútbol Acosta Ñu as a child. He joined amateur side Colonos Unidos, going on to make his senior debut with the side at the age of fourteen. He also represented youth side Oleariense, before trialling and signing with professional side Olimpia in November 2017.

In July 2021, González signed for Peruvian side USMP on loan.

On 31 January 2023, González joined Serie A side Lazio on an initial six-month loan, with an option to buy set to turn into an obligation depending on performance.

International career
González has represented Paraguay at youth international level.

Career statistics

Club

References

2003 births
Living people
Sportspeople from Asunción
Paraguayan footballers
Paraguay youth international footballers
Association football forwards
Liga Panameña de Fútbol players
Peruvian Primera División players
Liga de Expansión MX players
Club Olimpia footballers
Club Nacional footballers
Club Libertad footballers
Club Deportivo Universidad de San Martín de Porres players
Club Celaya footballers
S.S. Lazio players
Paraguayan expatriate footballers
Expatriate footballers in Panama
Paraguayan expatriate sportspeople in Peru
Expatriate footballers in Peru
Paraguayan expatriate sportspeople in Mexico
Expatriate footballers in Mexico
Paraguayan expatriate sportspeople in Italy
Expatriate footballers in Italy